Jacquie may refer to any of these people:

Jacquie Armstrong, Canadian curler
Jacquie Beltrao, British sports journalist and presenter
Jacquie de Creed (died 2011), English stunt woman
Jacquie Durrell, first wife of Gerald Durrell
Jacquie Jordan, U.S. film and television producer
Jacquie Lyn (1928-2002), British born American child actress
Jacquie O'Neill, English illustrator
Jacquie O'Sullivan, English singer and songwriter
Jacquie Perrin, Canadian journalist
Jacquie Petrusma, Australian politician
Jacquie Phelan, U.S. cyclist

Feminine given names